Prefectural elections for the Tokyo Metropolitan Assembly was held on 23 June 2013, one month before 2013 Japanese House of Councillors election.

The Liberal Democratic Party took majority control of the assembly from the Democratic Party of Japan after Prime Minister Shinzo Abe stated that the election had to be won "at any cost" in order to set the stage for an LDP victory in the House of Councillors election. Abe used the victory to claim popular backing for his "Abenomics" economic policies. The Japan Restoration Party performed poorly after controversial remarks by its leader Toru Hashimoto regarding comfort women, while Your Party made gains in the assembly after distancing itself from the JRP.

Candidates

{| class="wikitable"
|-
|+Number of candidates
!rowspan=2|Party
!rowspan=2|Total (Women)
!colspan=3|Candidates
!rowspan=2|Pre-electionstrength
|-
!Incumbent
!Former members
!Newcomer
|-
|Democratic Party
|align="right"|44(6)
|align="right"|39
|align="right"|0
|align="right"|5
|align="right"|43
|-
|Liberal Democratic Party
| align="right" |59(3)
|align="right"|34
|align="right"|6
|align="right"|19
|align="right"|39
|-
|New Komeito
| align="right" |23(3)
|align="right"|23
|align="right"|0
|align="right"|0
|align="right"|23
|-
|Japanese Communist Party
|align="right"|42(16)
|align="right"|6
|align="right"|5
|align="right"|31
|align="right"|8
|-
|Japan Restoration Party
| align="right" |34(7)
|align="right"|3
|align="right"|3
|align="right"|28
|align="right"|3
|-
|Tokyo Seikatsusha Network
| align="right" |5(5)
|align="right"|2
|align="right"|0
|align="right"|3
|align="right"|2
|-
|Your Party
| align="right" |20(7)
|align="right"|1
|align="right"|0
|align="right"|19
|align="right"|1
|-
|People's Life Party
| align="right" |3(1)
|align="right"|0
|align="right"|1
|align="right"|2
|align="right"|0
|-
|Social Democratic Party
| align="right" |1(0)
|align="right"|0
|align="right"|0
|align="right"|1
|align="right"|0
|-
|Green Wind
| align="right" |1(1)
|align="right"|0
|align="right"|0
|align="right"|1
|align="right"|0
|-
|Minor parties
| align="right" |4(0)
|align="right"|0
|align="right"|1
|align="right"|3
|align="right"|0
|-
|Independent
| align="right" |17(4)
|align="right"|3
|align="right"|0
|align="right"|14
|align="right"|6
|-
!
!253(53)
!111
!16
!126
!125
|}

Results

|-
! style="background-color:#E9E9E9;text-align:left;" |Party
! style="background-color:#E9E9E9;text-align:left;" |Candidates
! style="background-color:#E9E9E9;text-align:right;" |Votes
! style="background-color:#E9E9E9;text-align:right;" |%
! style="background-color:#E9E9E9;text-align:right;" |Seats
|-
| style="text-align:left;" |Liberal Democratic Party of Japan (自由民主党, Jiyū Minshutō)
| style="text-align:right;" | 59
| style="text-align:right;" | 1,633,303
| style="text-align:right;" | 36.04
| style="text-align:right;" | 59
|-
| style="text-align:left;" |New Komeito Party (公明党, Kōmeitō)
| style="text-align:right;" | 23
| style="text-align:right;" | 639,160
| style="text-align:right;" | 14.10
| style="text-align:right;" | 23
|-
| style="text-align:left;" |Japanese Communist Party (日本共産党, Nihon Kyōsan-tō)
| style="text-align:right;" | 42
| style="text-align:right;" | 616,721
| style="text-align:right;" | 13.61
| style="text-align:right;" | 17
|-
| style="text-align:left;" |Democratic Party of Japan (民主党, Minshutō)
| style="text-align:right;" | 44
| style="text-align:right;" | 690,622
| style="text-align:right;" | 15.24
| style="text-align:right;" | 15
|-
| style="text-align:left;" |Your Party (みんなの党 Minna no Tō)
| style="text-align:right;" | 20
| style="text-align:right;" | 311,278
| style="text-align:right;" | 6.87
| style="text-align:right;" | 7
|-
| style="text-align:left;" |Tokyo Seikatsusha Network (東京・生活者ネットワーク)
| style="text-align:right;" | 5
| style="text-align:right;" | 94,239
| style="text-align:right;" | 2.08
| style="text-align:right;" | 3
|-
| style="text-align:left;" |Japan Restoration Party (日本維新の会 Nippon Ishin no Kai)
| style="text-align:right;" | 34
| style="text-align:right;" | 374,109
| style="text-align:right;" | 8.25
| style="text-align:right;" | 2
|-
| style="text-align:left;" |Social Democratic Party (社民党 Shamin-tō)
| style="text-align:right;" | 1
| style="text-align:right;" | 12,948
| style="text-align:right;" | 0.29
| style="text-align:right;" | 0
|-
| style="text-align:left;" |People's Life First (生活の党 Seikatsu no Tō)
| style="text-align:right;" | 3
| style="text-align:right;" | 9,563
| style="text-align:right;" | 0.21
| style="text-align:right;" | 0
|-
| style="text-align:left;" |Green Wind (みどりの風 Midori no Kaze)
| style="text-align:right;" | 1
| style="text-align:right;" | 6,463
| style="text-align:right;" | 0.14
| style="text-align:right;" | 0
|-
| style="text-align:left;" | Others
| style="text-align:right;" | 4
| style="text-align:right;" | 25,421
| style="text-align:right;" | 0.56
| style="text-align:right;" | 0
|-
| style="text-align:left;" | Independents
| style="text-align:right;" | 17
| style="text-align:right;" | 118,450
| style="text-align:right;" | 2.61
| style="text-align:right;" | 1
|-
|style="text-align:left;background-color:#E9E9E9"|Total (turnout 43.50%)
|style="text-align:right;background-color:#E9E9E9" | 253
|style="text-align:right;background-color:#E9E9E9"| 4,532,279
|style="text-align:right;background-color:#E9E9E9"| 100.00
|style="text-align:right;background-color:#E9E9E9"| 127
|-
| style="text-align:left;" colspan=5 |Source: Tokyo electoral commission 
|}

References

2013 elections in Japan
Tokyo prefectural elections
June 2013 events in Japan
2013 in Tokyo